Egan is a surname that comes from the Irish Gaelic name Mac Aodhagáin. It is derived from the root 'aedh' meaning little fire and the diminutive 'an' hence 'the little bright-eyed one'. Variations include: Egan, Eagan, Keegan, McKeegan, MacEgan, Kegan, Keagan and Egen.  The name originates from County Tipperary (north). The Egans have been around for thousands of years and own a castle in Tipperary, Ireland, called Redwood Castle.

People with this surname
 Anthony Egan, Gaelic footballer
 Alice Mary Egan (1872 – 1972), Canadian ceramic artist later known as Alice Mary Hagen
 Chandler Egan, golfer
 Chris Egan (disambiguation), several people
 Connie Egan, Northern Irish politician
 Daniel Egan, former mayor of Sydney, Australia
 Dennis Egan (born 1947), Alaska politician
 Desmond Egan (born 1936), Irish poet, publisher, and festival organizer.
 Eddie Egan (1930–1995), New York police detective depicted in The French Connection
 Edward Egan (1932-2015), Roman Catholic Cardinal
 Eugene Egan, Catholic apostolic vicar in Ireland
 Felim Egan, painter
 George W. Egan, South Dakota politician
 Ger Egan (born 1990/1991), Westmeath Gaelic footballer
 Gerard Egan, psychologist
 Greg Egan, author
 Harry Egan, English footballer
 James Egan (disambiguation), several people called James or Jim
 Jennifer Egan, author
 Joe Egan (disambiguation), several people
 John Egan (disambiguation), several people
 Johnny Egan (basketball), basketball player and coach
 Joseph F. Egan (c.1917–1964), New York politician
 Joseph V. Egan, New Jersey politician
 Kenny Egan, boxer
 Kian Egan (born 1980), singer, part of the band Westlife
 Kieran Egan (educationist), English educator
 Kieran Egan (politician), Irish politician
 Mark Egan, jazz musician
 Matthew Egan, Australian Rules footballer
 Maureen Egan, American writer and director of music videos and films
 Maurice Francis Egan, American writer and diplomat
 Michael Egan (disambiguation), several people
 Peter Egan British actor
 Philip Egan (born 1955), Bishop of Portsmouth
 Pierce Egan, journalist
 Richard Egan (disambiguation), several people
 Robert Egan, American restaurateur
 Robert J. Egan (Illinois politician), American judge and politician
 Robert J. Egan (Michigan politician), American politician
 Robert Shaw Egan (born 1945), American botanist and lichenologist
 Roma Egan, ballet dancer
 Rusty Egan, drummer 
 Sam Egan, journalist and producer
 Seamus Egan, musician
 Sean Egan, computer software developer
 Susan Egan, American actress
 Ted Egan, Australian folk musician and Administrator of the Northern Territory
 Thomas C. Egan (1894–1961), US federal judge
 Timothy Egan, writer
 Walter Egan (born 1948), American musician
 Walter Egan (golfer), golfer
 William Egan (disambiguation), several people
 Willie Egan (1933–2004), American musician

See also
 Egan (disambiguation)
 Eagan (disambiguation)